Fabio Badilini (born 22 October 1964 in Montichiari, Brescia) is an Italian scientist and business man. He has made major contributions to noninvasive electrocardiography not only through his individual contributions, but also through his truly remarkable ability to foster collaborations across scientific disciplines, academic institutions, governmental agencies, device manufacturers and industries around the world.

Early life and education 
Badilini received a master' s degree in biomedical engineering at the Politecnico University of Milan, Italy, in 1989 under Sergio Cerutti. There he focused on aspects of heart rate variability that led to the development of computer applications that are today widely employed in the field of central nervous system analysis. He received his Ph.D. in electrical engineering from the University of Rochester in 1994 under Arthur J. Moss. His thesis was on beat-to-beat ST segment displacement assessment in Holter recordings. His major innovations related to ST segment variability analyses have given new impetus to improved quantitative analysis of noninvasive electrocardiographic recordings. His techniques and approaches are widely used. While working as a post-doctoral fellow with Philippe Coumel at Lariboisiere Hospital in Paris from 1994 to 1998, Badilini was instrumental in the development of the Holter Bin Method for assessing the effect of heart rate upon the QT interval that has been used in New Drug Applications to the FDA.

Career

1990s 
In 1998, he led the working team that defined the ISHNE ECG format from ambulatory ECG recordings. Notably, he was the lead technical contributor in the creation of data standards for digital ECGs submitted to the FDA ECG Warehouse  used for the safety evaluation of new drugs. Badilini also developed the first ECG computer application used by the FDA to review digital ECG files on the ECG recordings electronically submitted with the new standard. Nearly every provider of ECG safety data in the drug approval process worldwide uses his tools. In addition to these contributions on standard ECG signal processing, he has developed tools to extract optimal ECG waveforms from 12-lead Holter data based upon recording artifact and heart rate stability for QT measurement.

2000s 
Since 1998, he has worked in the pharmaceutical industry arena, and he is the founder and executive vice president of AMPS-LLC, NY, a company tailoring software-oriented solutions involving analysis of biomedical signals. He maintains a series of worldwide academic collaborations with leaders in many aspects of cardiovascular signals processing.

Honors and awards  
 2 October 2003 - FDA Commissioner Special citation, for “Development of a format for regulatory submission of annotated electrocardiographic waveform data to meet FDA’s needs in assessing the proarrhythmic potentials of drugs.
 30 March 2009 -  American College of Cardiology Honorary Fellowship Award 2009 in recognition of his contributions to the field of non-invasive electrocardiology

Published work

Notes

Biomedical engineers
1964 births
Living people
Italian bioengineers
Businesspeople from Brescia
Engineers from Brescia